Charles and Annie Quinlan House, also known as The Inn on Prospect Hill and Prospect Hill, is a historic home located at Waynesville, Haywood County, North Carolina. It was built in 1901–1902, and is a -story, transitional Queen Anne / Colonial Revival style frame dwelling.  It consists of an irregular form core hipped on three sides, gabled on the north, and expanded on all sides with hip-roof wings or bays.

It was listed on the National Register of Historic Places in 2005.

References

Houses on the National Register of Historic Places in North Carolina
Queen Anne architecture in North Carolina
Colonial Revival architecture in North Carolina
Houses completed in 1902
Houses in Haywood County, North Carolina
National Register of Historic Places in Haywood County, North Carolina
Waynesville, North Carolina